Barbotan-les-Thermes is a spa in the Gers department of south-western France.

Barbotan lies on the Route nationale 524 (N524).

The N524 forms part of the Itinéraire à Grand Gabarit, a route which has been modified to allow its use by the oversize road convoys conveying body sections and wings of the Airbus A380 airliner, and several upgrades were made to the road through Barbotan to this end.

References

Geography of Gers
Spa towns in France